René Deceja (16 April 1934 – 21 July 2007) was a Uruguayan cyclist. He competed at the 1956 Summer Olympics and the 1968 Summer Olympics.

References

External links
 

1934 births
2007 deaths
Uruguayan male cyclists
Olympic cyclists of Uruguay
Cyclists at the 1956 Summer Olympics
Cyclists at the 1968 Summer Olympics
People from Canelones Department
Pan American Games medalists in cycling
Pan American Games bronze medalists for Uruguay
Competitors at the 1959 Pan American Games
Medalists at the 1959 Pan American Games